The Kranzberg (3,742 m) is a mountain of the Bernese Alps, overlooking the Aletsch Glacier in the Swiss canton of Valais, close to the border with the canton of Bern. Its massif separates two glaciers: the Grosser Aletschfirn and the Jungfraufirn, both part of the Aletsch Glacier.

A prominent unnamed secondary summit (3,666 m) is located south-east of the main peak.

Debris accumulating on both sides of the mountain form one of the two important supraglacial moraines of the Aletsch Glacier (see picture on the top right of the article).

References

External links
 Kranzberg on Hikr

Bernese Alps
Mountains of the Alps
Alpine three-thousanders
Mountains of Valais
Mountains of Switzerland